The Black Star is a 1922 German silent film directed by James Bauer and starring Hans Mierendorff and Werner Funck.

Cast

References

Bibliography

External links

1922 films
Films of the Weimar Republic
Films directed by James Bauer
German silent feature films
German black-and-white films
Films based on Norwegian novels